Lucía Gevert Parada (born 1932) is a Chilean journalist, writer, editor, and former diplomat to West Germany during the military dictatorship of Augusto Pinochet. She was a founder of the latter, along with the writers Marcela Paz, Alicia Morel, and Maité Allamand, among others. She was also a participant in the founding of Televisión Nacional de Chile and the children's literature magazine Colibrí.

In 1968 she participated in the Congress of Latin American Women.

During her professional career she has received several honors for her journalistic work, including the Lenka Franulic Award in 1970 and the John Reitemeyer Prize for scientific journalism from the Inter American Press Association.

Gevert's first publication in the narrative genre was El puma in 1969, which received mixed reviews. Her literary work has ventured into poetry, short stories, essays, and anthologies, including 1992's El mundo de Amado, where she assembled a juvenile anthology of indigenous legends from Tierra del Fuego. In 2002, IBBY Chile selected three of her stories from El gatito que no sabía ronronear y otros cuentos as the best of 2001.

Works
 El puma (1969)
 Conversaciones con el Profesor Zahvedruz
 Los cometas y la gravitación universal
 Lo cuenta el Cono Sur : mitos de nuestra tierra

As coauthor
 Aguas oscuras
 Cuentos cortos de la tierra larga
 El mundo de Amado (1992), compilation of indigenous legends
 Lo cuenta el Cono Sur
 El mar encantado
 El gatito que no sabía ronronear y otros cuentos, with illustrations by Andrés Jullian
 Baile de primavera (1995), with illustrations by Andrés Jullian
 Mitos y leyendas de nuestra América
 Cuentos del fin del mundo
 Los cometas y la gravitación: el hechizo del Halley, series of interviews

References

1932 births
20th-century Chilean women writers
20th-century Chilean poets
21st-century Chilean women writers
21st-century Chilean poets
Ambassadors of Chile to Germany
Chilean editors
Chilean women editors
Chilean journalists
Chilean people of German descent
Chilean women journalists
Living people
Pontifical Catholic University of Chile alumni
Women ambassadors
Women print editors
Writers from Santiago
Chilean women diplomats
Chilean diplomats
Chilean women poets
20th-century Chilean short story writers
Chilean women short story writers
Chilean essayists
21st-century Chilean short story writers